Kızıltepe is a village in the Maden District of Elazığ Province in Turkey. Its population is 200 (2021).

References

Villages in Maden District